The 1966 All-Big Ten Conference football team consists of American football players chosen by various organizations for All-Big Ten Conference teams for the 1966 Big Ten Conference football season. Players from the 1966 Michigan State Spartans football team dominated the All-Big Ten team in 1966, taking eight of the 22 first-team spots. Players from Purdue and Michigan each received four spots.

Offensive selections

Quarterbacks
 Bob Griese, Purdue (AP-1; UPI-1)
 Jimmy Raye II, Michigan State (AP-2; UPI-2)

Running backs
 Clinton Jones, Michigan State (AP-1; UPI-1 [halfback])
 Jim Detwiler, Michigan (AP-1; UPI-1 [halfback])
 Dave Fisher, Michigan (AP-2; UPI-1 [fullback])
 Bob Apisa, Michigan State (AP-1)
 Bo Rein, Ohio State (AP-2; UPI-2 [halfback])
 Carl Ward, Michigan (AP-2; UPI-2 [halfback])
 Mike Krivoshia, Indian (UPI-2 [fullback])

Ends
 Gene Washington, Michigan State (AP-1; UPI-1)
 Jack Clancy, Michigan (AP-1; UPI-1)
 John Wright, Illinois (AP-2; UPI-2)
 Jim Beirne, Purdue (AP-2)
 Casimir Banalzek, Northwestern (UPI-2)

Tackles
 Jack Calcaterra, Purdue (AP-1; UPI-1)
 Jerry West, Michigan State (AP-1; UPI-1)
 Mike Barnes, Purdue (AP-2; UPI-2)
 John Przybcki, Michigan State (AP-2)
 James Hribal, Michigan (AP-2)

Guards
 Chuck Erlenbaugh, Purdue (AP-1)
 Tom Schuette, Indiana (AP-1)
 Donald Bailey, Michigan (UPI-1)
 Anthony Conti, Michigan State (UPI-1)
 Henry Hanna, Michigan (AP-2)
 Bob Sebeck, Purdue (AP-2)
 Ron Guenther, Illinois (UPI-2)
 Bruce Gunstra, Northwestern (UPI-2)

Centers
 Ray Pryor, Ohio State (AP-1; UPI-1)
 Charles Killian, Minnesota (AP-2)
 Bob Van Pelt, Indiana (UPI-2)

Defensive selections

Ends
 Bubba Smith, Michigan State (AP-1; UPI-1)
 Ken Kmiec, Illinois (AP-1; UPI-2)
 George Olion, Purdue (UPI-1)
 Philip Hoag, Michigan State (AP-2)
 John McCambridge, Northwestern (UPI-2)
 Jim Sniadecki, Indiana (AP-2)

Tackles
 Lance Olssen, Purdue (AP-1; UPI-1)
 Nick Jordan, Michigan State (AP-1)
 Richard Himes, Ohio State (UPI-1)
 Pat Gallinagh, Michigan State (AP-2; UPI-2)
 Fred Harms, Illinois (AP-2)
 Jeff Richardson, Michigan State (UPI-2)

Guards
 Chuck Kyle, Purdue (UPI-1)
 Edward Duren, Minnesota (UPI-2)

Linebackers
 Frank Nunley, Michigan (AP-1; UPI-1)
 Chuck Thornhill, Michigan State (AP-1; UPI-1)
 George Webster, Michigan State (AP-1 [def. back]; UPI-1)
 Bob Richter, Wisconsin (AP-1)
 Dave Moreland, Iowa (AP-2; UPI-2)
 Frank Burke, Purdue (AP-2)
 Gary Reierson, Minnesota (AP-2)
 Bob Richter, Wisconsin (UPI-2)
 Dave Tomasula, Illinois (UPI-2)

Defensive backs
 Bruce Sullivan, Illinois (AP-1; UPI-1)
 Rich Volk, Michigan (AP-1; UPI-1) 
 Phil Clark, Northwestern (AP-1; UPI-2)
 Jess Philips, Michigan State (UPI-1)
 Leroy Keyes, Purdue (AP-2; UPI-2)
 Dick Gibbs, Iowa (AP-2)
 Phil Knell, Illinois (AP-2)
 John Rowser, Michigan (UPI-2)
 Tom Schinke, Wisconsin (AP-2)

Key
AP = Associated Press, "selected by a board of sports writers covering the Big Ten scene"

UPI = United Press International, selected by the conference coaches

Bold = First-team selection of both the AP and UPI

See also
1966 College Football All-America Team

References

All-Big Ten Conference
All-Big Ten Conference football teams